Villu (Tamil: வில்லு) (Telugu: విల్లు) means Bow in some South Indian Languages
 Hari Villu, a 2003 Indian Telugu film
 Onavillu, a simple, short bow-shaped musical instrument
 Villu (film), a 2009 Indian Tamil film starring Vijay 
 Villu Paatu (or 'Bow Song'), an ancient form of musical story-telling art of South Kerala and Tamil Nadu 
 Viluppuram (also spelled Villupuram), a district and town in Tamil Nadu, India
 Villu (given name), an Estonian masculine given name